Woodlands Primary School is a primary school in Pietermaritzburg, KwaZulu-Natal province, South Africa.

External links

Schools in KwaZulu-Natal